Vorwärts Stadium, also known as the LIWEST Arena, is a multi-purpose stadium in Steyr, Austria.  It is used mostly for football matches and is the home ground of SK Vorwärts Steyr.  The stadium holds 6,000 people and was built in 1986.

References 

Football venues in Austria
Steyr
Multi-purpose stadiums in Austria
Sports venues in Upper Austria